Calle José de Diego (José de Diego Street) is a major thoroughfare in the western Puerto Rico municipality of Mayagüez.  The street is oriented east–west with traffic running two-way drive with two lanes into downtown Mayagüez.

The street begins at Parque José de Diego and finish in dead-end aside PR-2 Highway. Is parallel with Méndez Vigo Street.

Alongside are located side entrances to the Hospital San Antonio and Hospital Perea, and some pubs.

History of the name
The street is named after José de Diego. Originally named Calle de la Rosa.

References

Streets in Mayagüez, Puerto Rico